Hellbastard is an English crust punk/thrash metal band formed in 1984 in Newcastle.

Early history
Members "Scruff" Lewty, Phil Laidlaw and Ian "Scotty" Scott formed Hellbastard, which was to be a combination of Crass-like politics and the music of Slayer. In 1990, after several EPs, full-lengths and line-up changes, the group appeared on the Combat-Earache compilation album, Grindcrusher, with the song "Justly Executed", from the Earache Records Natural Order LP.

They are considered to be a hugely influential band in the crust punk genre. The genre allegedly adopted its name from the band's first demo, Ripper Crust. They are also considered to be a part of the crossover thrash scene. After leaving Hellbastard, Scotty later went on to form Hellkrusher. At one time vocalist/guitarist "Scruff lewty" and ex-guitarist "Nick" (Nick Parsons) played for their friends' band "Energetic Krusher". Hellbastard also passed on a deal with Vinyl Solution Records in 1989 in favour of an opportunity with Energetic Krusher; their Path To Oblivion album appeared soon after. Hellbastard opted to sign with Earache.

Original vocalist/guitarist "Scruff" set about reforming the band in 2007 and Hellbastard concluded numerous American and European tours. Prior to this, "Scruff" had formed other acts, including Nero Circus, Sidewinder, King Fuel, Heavy Water, The Dischargers, and Moodhoover, all of which (with the exception of King Fuel) released albums and toured extensively. In 2018, Hellbastard were writing a new album, intended to be "vicious and different".

Members
Josh (drums)
Scruff (vocals, guitar)
Nick (bass)
Danny (guitar)

Discography 
 1985: Massacre Self - released rehearsal cassette
 1986: Ripper Crust demo cassette
 1987: Hate Militia demo cassette
 1988: Heading for Internal Darkness LP
 1988: A Vile Peace (compilation LP on Peaceville Records) (Civilised?)
 1989: They Brought Death 7-inch EP
 1990: Natural Order CD/LP/CASS
 1990: Heading for Internal Darkness CD/CASS reissue
 1993: Ripper Crust LP reissue
 1998: Heading for More Darkness CD reissue
 1998: "They Brought Death" on Skuld releases compilation LP
 1998: In Grind We Crust CD compilation
 1998: Blood, Fire, Hate... CD.
 2002: The Good Go First album (vinyl only)
 2009: Ripper Crust LP reissue
 2009: The Need to Kill CD/LP
2009: "Pylons II" video-audio
2009: "Fir Bolg - Bow to Slough Feg" - video-audio
2009: Eco-war EP/CD
2009: "Sea Shepherd" video-audio
2010: Heading for Internal Darkness LP reissue / CD version later 2010/early 2011
2010: Hellbastard/Dissent split 7-inch EP
2012: "Arcadia" video-audio
2013: "Sons of Bitches" CD/LP/12"
2013: "Hellbastard/Dresden" split 12-inch EP
2013: "Engineering Human Consciousness..." video-audio
2014: "Engineering Human Consciousness" 7-inch (coloured vinyl) limited edition
2015: "We are coven" video-audio
2015: "Feral" CD
2016: Hellbastard/Herida Profunda "To the Dead & Dying" picture disc LP
2016: Hellbastard /Herida Profunda "To the Dead & Dying" CD digipak
2017: "Feral" LP (only available on CD)
2017: "The Need to Kill..." cassette 
2017: "Heading for Internal Darkness w/ unheard bonus tracks (still unreleased)
2019: "Hate Militia" w/ unreleased tracks rough mix of Natural Order album 1989 CD

References

External links 
Official website

Crossover thrash groups
English thrash metal musical groups
Political music groups
British crust and d-beat groups
Musical groups from Newcastle upon Tyne